The MV Gondwana was a ship acquired by Greenpeace in 1988, originally built in 1975 and called the Viking. Greenpeace updated the ship with a helipad and accommodation space was increased to sleep 33 people.  The ship was used to supply the Greenpeace World Park Base in 1988/89 and was involved in direct action to protest against Japanese whaling in the Southern Ocean in the late 1980s.

References

External links
The MV Viking in dry-dock being converted to the MV Gondwana
The MV Gondwana in Antarctica

Ships built in Germany
1975 ships
Ships of Greenpeace